Thomas Prichard (born August 18, 1959) is a retired American professional wrestler and author. He is the older brother of Bruce Prichard.

Professional wrestling career

Early career (1979–1986) 
Tom Prichard began his career in Los Angeles, around 1979, working for Gene and Mike LeBell's Los Angeles Olympic Auditorium wrestling promotion, where he held several championships in that organization, including the Americas tag team title with Chris Adams. After LeBell closed the L.A. promotion down in 1982, Prichard competed in various NWA territories for the next four years (including a stint as color commentator in Georgia Championship Wrestling (replacing the departed Roddy Piper) in 1982-83) before settling in the southeast, where he had the greatest success of his career.

Continental Championship Wrestling / Continental Wrestling Federation (1986–1989) 
Prichard joined Continental Championship Wrestling in 1986, and by 1988, he feuded with "The Dirty White Boy" Tony Anthony. Their feud included a very controversial angle, which aired on April 23, 1988, where Anthony's valet came out with a black eye and begged Prichard to help her, only for Anthony to attack him from behind, cuff his hands behind his back and hang him. On October 3, 1988, in Birmingham, Alabama, he defeated Anthony in the finals of a tournament to win the vacant CWF Heavyweight Championship. Prichard lost the title to Wendell Cooley on April 7, 1989, in Knoxville, Tennessee, but regained the belt on June 23 of that year. He lost the title to Dennis Condrey a month later on July 22 in Dothan, Alabama, before once again regaining it after defeating Condrey on December 6 of that same year. Prichard held the title until the CWF closed later that month.

United States Wrestling Association (1990–1992) 
In 1990, Prichard then moved on to the United States Wrestling Association, first working out of the Texas branch, where he formed a heel stable that included Eric Embry and Steve Austin, managed by Tojo Yamamoto. They feuded with the other top babyfaces, including Jeff Jarrett, Bill Dundee, Robert Fuller, and others. While based out of Texas, Prichard won both the USWA Southern Heavyweight championship and the USWA Texas Heavyweight championship before the USWA closed the Texas end of their territory in November 1990. Afterwards, Prichard competed in the Memphis end of the USWA before the opening of Smoky Mountain Wrestling in 1992.

Smoky Mountain Wrestling and World Wrestling Federation (1992–1995) 

Stan Lane and Prichard formed a team as "The Heavenly Bodies" and joined Smoky Mountain Wrestling upon its formation in 1992, and on April 23, 1992, in Harrogate, Tennessee, they defeated The Fantastics to become the first SMW Tag Team Champions. They continued to feud with The Fantastics throughout mid-1992, and were finally defeated for the titles on August 8, 1992, in a barbed wire cage match in Johnson City, Tennessee. The Heavenly Bodies regained the titles two days later, holding them for three months before losing to the Rock 'N Roll Express on November 13, 1992, in a hospital elimination match in Harlan, Kentucky. They traded the titles with the Rock 'N Roll Express three times in a variety of hardcore matches over the following year before Lane left the promotion and retired from the ring.

Prichard reformed the Heavenly Bodies with Jimmy Del Ray, and the two competed in both SMW and the World Wrestling Federation, wrestling the WWF World tag team champions the Steiner Brothers at SummerSlam 1993. On November 24, 1993, in Boston on the World Wrestling Federation's pay-per-view Survivor Series 1993, Prichard and Del Ray defeated the Rock 'N Roll Express. The Rock 'N Roll Express regained the titles on February 18, 1994, in Port Huron, Michigan, but lost the titles to the Heavenly Bodies on the following day in Taylor, Michigan. At WrestleMania X the Heavenly Bodies defeated the Bushwhackers in a dark match.

The Rock 'N Roll Express defeated the Heavenly Bodies on April 1, 1994, in Pikeville, Kentucky in a "Loser Leaves SMW match", where they then competed in the World Wrestling Federation for about a year, before being released in the summer of 1995. Prichard fought in a couple of single matches against Bret Hart and Shawn Michaels. They returned to SMW and regained the SMW Tag Team Championship, marking Prichard's eighth title reign, on August 4, 1995, in Knoxville, Tennessee, defeating Tracy Smothers and Dirty White Boy at the Super Bowl of Wrestling. During the feud, The Thugs injured Prichard's leg, and he began wearing a loaded boot, which he used as a weapon to gain victories for him and Del Ray. They held the titles until the promotion folded on November 26, 1995. Also that summer they worked for United States Wrestling Association. They won the USWA TAg Team titles from PG-13 on August 7, 1995. After SMW folded, the Heavenly Bodies briefly wrestled for Extreme Championship Wrestling, until Prichard returned to the WWF.

Return to the WWF (1995–2004) 

Prichard competed under his own name with his Heavenly Bodies attire at the Survivor Series 1995, wrestling on future tag team partner Skip's team "The Bodydonnas."  Prichard was the first man eliminated as the Bodydonnas defeated Barry Horowitz's "Underdogs" team. A month later, Prichard was officially introduced as Zip, Skip's on-screen cousin and tag team partner, interfering in a match allowing Skip to defeat Rad Radford, who had been trying to become a Bodydonna himself. Before this appearance he had changed  his long curly brown hair into a dyed blond crew cut, to more resemble his storyline cousin.

On the WrestleMania XII pre-show, on March 31, 1996, the team defeated The Godwinns in the finals of an eight team tournament to win the vacant WWF Tag Team Championship. They held the titles until May 19, 1996, when they were defeated by the Godwinns in Madison Square Garden in New York City. After Skip left the WWF in fall of 1996, Prichard became a masked jobber named Dr.X. Dr. X fought mainly on house shows but made a few TV appearances on Superstars. Dr. X lost to Brakkus at In Your House 12: It's Time. By 1997, he became a trainer for the company, responsible for training such future stars as The Rock, Kurt Angle, and Mark Henry, among others. On November 16, 1998, Prichard became the masked Blue Blazer teaming with Jeff Jarrett losing to Steve Blackman and Goldust on Raw Is War. The next week he lost to Blackman and December 21 both on Raw Is War. The Blue Blazer gimmick was related to Owen Hart storylines and Hart's feud with Blackman. On September 27, 1999, Prichard teamed up with Jeff Jarrett to face against Chyna and Debra on Raw Is War. Prichard hit Chyna with a guitar and Jarrett was knocked out cold as Chyna went for the victory. He also occasionally commentated for shows such as WWF Metal. In addition, Prichard made a few appearances as a singles wrestler for ECW, and also co-hosted Byte This!, the WWF's internet talk show. Prichard was released from WWE in 2004.

Independent circuit (2004–2007) 
He went on to wrestle in the United Wrestling Association and in various other independent promotions in the Southeastern United States. He also holds training seminars in conjunction with certain promotions. During this time Prichard also befriended online professional wrestling journalist James Guttman of World Wrestling Insanity and provided a weekly commentary on the world of pro wrestling entitled Tuesdays with Tom. On August 10, 2006, eight days prior to his 47th birthday, he became the oldest man to win the United Wrestling Association Heavyweight Championship, defeating Dillinger for the title.

Second return to WWE (2007–2012) 
In January 2007, he was rehired by WWE and replaced Bill DeMott as the head trainer for Deep South Wrestling (DSW).
When DSW closed, he was moved to WWE's new developmental territory Florida Championship Wrestling. On May 30, 2012, Prichard was released from the WWE, being replaced by Bill DeMott as the head trainer.

Independent Circuit (2017)

In 2017, Prichard had a match in Runcorn Wrestling Academy (RWA) in which he teamed in an 8-man tag team match with the owner of the RWA and his former OVW trainee, Andreas Rossi (Andy Baker), Chris Von Sharpe and Connor “The Bullet” Stafford to take on the team of “Fantastic” Matt Fox, Demoni, Johnathan Alexander and Mr. Williams. At the end of this match both Prichard and Rossi announced that this was their last match.

Wrestlers trained
Kurt Angle
Val Venis
Randy Orton
The Rock
Shane McMahon
Giant Silva
Jamey Best
The Bella Twins
Steve Bradley
Dolph Ziggler
Brakkus
Cheeseburger
 Lady Luna: Known for the shortest professional wrestling debut match in the history of professional wrestling, losing in less than 60 seconds.

Championships and accomplishments
All-Star Wrestling
ASW Southern Heavyweight Championship (1 time)
American Wrestling Council
AWC Heavyweight Championship (1 time)
Five Star Wrestling
FSW Tag Team Championship (1 time) – with Smack Johnson
Global Championship Wrestling
Texas Heavyweight Championship (1 time)
NWA Hollywood Wrestling
NWA Americas Tag Team Championship (5 times) – with Apollo Jalisco (2), Alberto Madril (2), and Chris Adams (1)
NWA Rocky Top
NWA Rocky Top Heavyweight Championship (1 time)
NWA Wrestle Birmingham
NWA Alabama Heavyweight Championship (1 time)
Pacific Northwest Wrestling
NWA Pacific Northwest Tag Team Championship (3 times) – with Brett Sawyer
Pennsylvania Championship Wrestling 14 times
PCW Tag Team Championship (1 time) – with Jimmy Del Ray
Pro Wrestling Illustrated
PWI ranked him # 318 of the 500 best singles wrestlers of the PWI Years in 2003
PWI ranked him # 73 of the 100 best tag teams of the PWI Years, with Jimmy Del Ray and Stan Lane in 2003.
Ring Around The Northwest Newsletter
Tag Team of the Year (1984) with Brett Sawyer
Southeastern Championship Wrestling / Continental Championship Wrestling / Continental Wrestling Federation
CWF Heavyweight Championship (3 times)
NWA Alabama Heavyweight Championship (2 times)
NWA Southeast United States Junior Heavyweight Championship (5 times)
Smoky Mountain Wrestling
SMW Tag Team Championship (8 times) – with Stan Lane (5) and Jimmy Del Ray (3)
United States Wrestling Association
USWA Southern Heavyweight Championship (6 times)
USWA Texas Heavyweight Championship (2 times)
USWA World Tag Team Championship (1 time) – with Jimmy Del Ray
United Wrestling Association
UWA Southern Heavyweight Championship (1 time)
UWA Texas Heavyweight Championship (1 time)
World Wrestling Federation
WWF Tag Team Championship (1 time) – with Skip
WWF Tag Team Championship Tournament (1996) - with Skip

Luchas de Apuestas record

References

External links 
 Prichard's opinion column at WorldWrestlingInsanity.com
 
 

1959 births
American male professional wrestlers
Living people
People from Houston
Professional wrestlers from Texas
Professional wrestling trainers
The Stud Stable members
20th-century professional wrestlers
21st-century professional wrestlers
USWA World Tag Team Champions
SMW Tag Team Champions
NWA Americas Tag Team Champions